is one of Japan's largest homebuilders. It was founded on August 1, 1960 and is headquartered in Osaka. In 2009, Sekisui House expanded into Australia and Russia before expanding into China and the United States the following year.

The company has origins in and is affiliated with :ja:積水化学工業 (Sekisui Chemical), which once was a major chemical firm, but has since diversified due to Asian competition; they supply medical diagnostic lab equipment and manufacture pharmaceuticals worldwide.  The chemical firm has over 100 subsidiaries and affiliates.

References 

http://www.hoovers.com/company/Sekisui_House_Ltd/htyyif-1.html
http://www.thefifthestate.com.au/archives/3760
http://www.abnnewswire.net/companies/en/32936/Sekisui-House,-Ltd
https://www.reuters.com/article/idUSBNG49705320090716
http://www.japancorp.net/Article.Asp?Art_ID=18691
http://www.alacrastore.com/company-snapshot/Sekisui_House_Ltd-1015086

External links 
 Sekisui House website 
 Sekisui House Australia website 

Real estate companies established in 1960
Construction and civil engineering companies of Japan
Real estate companies of Japan
Companies based in Osaka Prefecture
Construction and civil engineering companies established in 1960
Companies listed on the Tokyo Stock Exchange
Companies listed on the Osaka Exchange
Japanese brands
Midori-kai
Japanese companies established in 1960